Bregenz Handball is a handball club from Bregenz, Austria. They currently compete in the Handball Liga Austria.

History

Bregenz Handball was founded in 1946 at the divisions of SC Schwarz-Weiß Bregenz. The team initially played in the German championships. In the 1995/1996 season, the team switched from the German championship to the Austrian championship. After two years in the 2nd league, in the 1996/1997 season, it was promoted to the first division with a championship title. After the handball division of SC Schwarz-Weiß Bregenz operated as an independent club for several years, the parent association was effectively separated in 1996. The growing importance of the club allowed different companies to become involved as main and name sponsors, so the club name changed often (Casino Zima Alno Bregenz, PTA Bregenz, Post Bregenz, jet2web Bregenz, A1 Bregenz). It was only in the 2012/2013 season that the club management decided that the main sponsor no longer had any influence on the name of the club. The team won the Austrian Cup in 2000. A year later, the first league title in the club's history followed. The team won the Austrian championship 9 times in total (the Austrian record) and the Austrian cup 5 times.

Crest, colours, supporters

Club crest

Kit manufacturers

Kits

Sports Hall information

Arena: – Sporthalle Rieden-Vorkloster
City: – Bregenz
Capacity: – 1600
Address: –  Burggräflergasse 11, 6900 Bregenz, Austria

Management

Team

Current squad 

Squad for the 2022–23 season

Technical staff
 Head coach:   Michael Roth
 Assistant coach:  Marko Tanasković
 Goalkeeping coach:  Goran Aleksić
 Athletic Trainer:  Johannes Sturn
 Physiotherapist:  Gerd Rainer
 Physiotherapist:  Niklas Engel
 Club Doctor:  Dr. Johannes Hartl

Transfers
Transfers for the 2022–23 season

Joining 
  Raphael König (RW) from  SC Ferlach
  Robin Kritzinger (RW) from  Alpla HC Hard
  Sebastian Burger (LW) from  BT Füchse
  Dragan Pavlović (RB) from  RK Koper
  Uroš Mitrović (RB) on loan from  Wisła Płock

Leaving 
  Ante Ešegović (RB) (retires)
  Goran Aleksić (GK) (retires)
  Marko Tanasković (RB) (retires)
  Marijan Rojnica (RW) to  SV Fides St. Gallen
  Marko Čorić (LP) to  Fram Reykjavík
  Luka Vukićević (RB) to  Fram Reykjavík
  Dragan Pavlović (RB) to  RK Koper

Previous Squads

Titles 

 Austrian Championship
 Winner (9) : 2001, 2002, 2004, 2005, 2006, 2007, 2008, 2009, 2010

 Austrian Cup
 Winner (4) : 2000, 2002, 2003, 2006

EHF ranking

Former club members

Notable former players

  Christian Aigner (2003–2007)
  Dominik Bammer (2014–2018)
  Damir Djukic (2005–2007)
  Ante Ešegović (2012–2022)
  Lukas Frühstück (2007–)
  Gregor Günther (1995–2011)
  Matthias Günther (1994–2002, 2007–2012)
  Philipp Günther (2000–2013)
  Ralf Patrick Häusle (2008–)
  Mare Hojc (2007–2009)
  Marian Klopcic (2009–)
  Michael Knauth (1994–2008)
  Sebastian Manhart (1992–2005)
  Nikola Marinovic (2005–2009)
  Lucas Mayer (2006–2017)
  Fabian Posch (2006–2011)
  Roland Schlinger (2002–2006, 2007–2010)
  Björn Tyrner (2008–2011)
  Markus Wagesreiter (2010–2012)
  Konrad Wilczynski (2002–2006)
  Nikola Prce (2006–2007)
  Vedran Banić (2010–2012)
  Miro Barišić (2000–2002)
  Mario Bjeliš (2005–2007)
  Vladimir Božić (2015)
  Marko Buvinić (2016–2017)
  Filip Gavranović (2013–2015)
  Bruno Gudelj (1999–2003)
  Josip Jurić-Grgić (2018–2021)
  Kristijan Ljubanović (2002–2005)
  Mario Obad (2007–2010)
  Holger Schneider (1998–1999)
  Hans Peter Motzfeldt-Kyed (1995–2001)
  Dagur Sigurðsson (2003–2007)
  Povilas Babarskas (2012–2015, 2017–2021)
  Arūnas Vaškevičius (2001–2005)
  Risto Arnaudovski (2011–2012)
  Vlatko Mitkov (2018–2020)
  Draško Mrvaljević (2012–2013)
  Espen Lie Hansen (2015–2016)
  Mikhail Vinogradov (2021–)
  Luka Kikanović (2017–2019)
  Goran Aleksić (2009–2022)
  Bojan Beljanski (2015–2018)
  Nemanja Beloš (2016–2017)
  Ivan Dimitrijević (2013–2014)
  Tobias Warvne (2014–2017)
  Roman Chychykalo (2017–2018)

Former coaches

References

External links
 
 

Austrian handball clubs